Judy Blye Wilson (born in Houston, Texas) is an American casting director known for her work on soap operas.  She has been casting for soaps operas for over 25 years.

Life and career
Between 1981 and 1987 she was casting director of Ryan's Hope.  In 1988, she started work on One Life to Live until she was hired by Minei Behr in 1991 to work on All My Children till the soap's end in 2011. Later that year she became the casting director of The Young and the Restless.

In 2005 she was the casting director of the short film Exit in which she cast actors from her previous soaps, Kassie DePaiva, who plays Blair on One Life to Live, and Jack Scalia, who played Christopher Stamp on All My Children.

Wilson has won three consecutive Daytime Emmy Awards for "Outstanding Achievement in Casting for a Drama Series" for her work with All My Children.  She has been responsible for casting some of the most popular names in that show's history, including Sarah Michelle Gellar as Kendall Hart in 1993. Wilson has won 6 Arios Awards from the Casting Society of America.

Blye Wilson was married to actor Trey Wilson from 1975 until his death in 1989. Her brother is Richard Blye. Her sister was the actress Maggie Blye who died of cancer at 73 in March 2016 in her West Hollywood home. On July 1, 2016 it was announced that Judy had left her post as Casting Director of The Young and the Restless.

Casting director credits
All My Children (1991–2011)
One Life to Live (1988–1991)
Ryan's Hope (1981–1987)The Young and the Restless (2011—2016)
Exit
Another Night

Awards and nominations
Daytime Emmy Award
Nominated, 2006, Casting, All My ChildrenWin, 2002–2004 & 2013 Casting, All My ChildrenCasting Society of America
Nominated, 1994–2007, Casting, All My ChildrenWin, 1995, 1998–2000, 2003–2006, Casting, All My ChildrenWin, 2011, Casting, The Young and the Restless''

References

External links

Year of birth missing (living people)
People from Houston
American casting directors
Women casting directors
Living people